Ujjwal Rana is an Indian actor, producer, and film personality who is known for his roles in Saathiya, BHK Bhalla@Halla.Kom, and television shows such as Meher (2004), and Ghar Ek Sapnaa (2007).

Career
Rana is a model-turned-actor who has appeared in various television commercials. He appeared in Sathiya, which was directed by Mani Ratnam. He was seen in shows like Meher (2004), in which he played the role of Zayed Khan, and Sawaare Sabke Sapne... Preeto (2011), in which he played the role of Bobby. He portrayed Samman in the series called Ghar Ek Sapnaa. He was later replaced in the show. He has also produced a series called Mrs. & Mr. Sharma Allahabadwale (2010).

Filmography
As Actor

Films

Television

As Producer
 Mrs. & Mr. Sharma Allahabadwale (2010)

References

Indian male television actors
Living people
Year of birth missing (living people)